"Brandy", later called "Mandy", is a song written by Scott English and Richard Kerr. It was originally recorded by English in 1971 and reached the top 20 of the UK Singles Chart.

"Brandy" was recorded by New Zealand singer Bunny Walters in 1972, but achieved greater success when released in the United States in 1974 by Barry Manilow. For Manilow's recording, the title changed from "Brandy" to "Mandy" to avoid confusion with Looking Glass's "Brandy (You're a Fine Girl)". His version reached the top of the US Hot 100 Singles Chart. Later, it was recorded by many other artists. The song was a UK number-one hit in 2003 for Irish boyband Westlife.

Scott English original recording
Under the title Brandy, the selection's original title, the song charted in 1971 for Scott English, one of its co-composers, whose version of it reached #12 in the UK Singles Charts. It was also released in the United States, where it was a minor hit, remaining in the lower portion of the Hot 100.

The suggestion that Scott English wrote the song about a favorite dog is apparently false. English later said that a reporter called him early one morning asking who "Brandy" was, and an irritated English made up the dog story to get the reporter off his back. In a 2013 interview, he said the idea for the song title came while he was in France and someone tried to make a dirty joke saying "Brandy goes down fine after dinner, doesn't she" although in English, a drink does not actually have a grammatical gender, and the line does not have the intended double entendre. He later wrote the song in London. He said he hated the Manilow version because he took out part of a verse and made it a bridge, but he later loved it because it bought him houses. The song was inspired by his life, he said, the face in the window being his father.

Charts

Bunny Walters version

In 1972, Bunny Walters recorded "Brandy" and had a hit with it in New Zealand. The backing vocals were by The Yandall Sisters. He later included the song on his album Very Best of Bunny Walters.

Barry Manilow version

In 1974, Barry Manilow recorded the song under the title name of "Mandy". The song was Manilow's first #1 hit on the Billboard Hot 100 and Easy Listening charts, and his first gold single.

In the three years between English's and Manilow's recordings, Looking Glass's "Brandy (You're a Fine Girl)" had hit #1 in 1972. When Clive Davis suggested that Manilow record the selection, the singer changed the title to "Mandy" to avoid confusion. Joe Renzetti arranged the record.

In the Manilow version, the first two lines from the fourth verse, following the instrumental section, were omitted. They were:

"Riding on a country bus/No one even noticed us."

The remaining lines were then used as a bridge instead.

Cash Box said "a lushly orchestrated ballad it is a classic love song with Barry doing some fine piano work." Record World said that "Manilow's performance builds from his solo foundation to the rafters of Joe Renzetti's romantic strings."

In "Judgment," the season 2 premiere of Angel, the eponymous protagonist sings "Mandy" at Lorne's Caritas karaoke bar in exchange for information.

Chart performance

Weekly charts

Year-end charts

Certifications

Westlife version

Irish boy band Westlife covered "Mandy" in 2003 and released it as the second single from their fourth studio album, Turnaround (2003), in November 2003. The single peaked at number one on the UK Singles Chart to become the band's 12th number-one single on the chart. The single sold over 200,000 copies in the UK to earn a silver sales certification. Westlife's version was the fifth-best-selling single of 2003 in Ireland. "Mandy" is the band's 16th-best-selling single in paid-for and combined sales in the UK as of January 2019.

The music video was filmed in the United Great Lodge of England, Freemasons' Hall, London. Their version won them their third Record of the Year award, in under five years. Their version is also the longest leap to the top (from 200 to 1) in UK music history. In Westlife - Our Story the band said the idea to record and release the song was Simon Cowell's.

Track listings
UK CD1
 "Mandy" – 3:19
 "You See Friends (I See Lovers)" – 4:11
 "Greased Lightning" – 3:19
 "Mandy" (video) – 3:19
 "Mandy" (making of the video) – 2:00

UK CD2
 "Mandy" – 3:19
 "Flying Without Wings" (live) – 3:41

Charts

Weekly charts

Year-end charts

Certifications and sales

Other versions

"Mandy" has been covered many times. Notable cover versions include: 
Bunny Walters in 1972 (as "Brandy" as in the original)
Andy Williams (1975)
Johnny Mathis (1975)
Ray Conniff & The Singers (1975)
Patty Pravo (1975) in Italian as "Rispondi" on her Incontro album.
Kai Hyttinen (1975) sung as "Leena" with Finnish text by Vexi Salmi.
Claude François (1976) sang the French version ("Mandy" as well)
Jimmy Castor did a mostly instrumental version on his album Maximum Stimulation in 1977.
Karel Gott (1977) sung as "Jsou svátky" with Czech text by Zdeněk Borovec.
Drop Nineteens (1992)
Richard Clayderman (1994)
Me First and the Gimme Gimmes (1997)
Box Car Racer (2002)
Helmut Lotti (2003)
Bradley Joseph (2005)
Clay Aiken (2005)
Donny Osmond (2007)
Jang Keun-suk (2011)
The Bad Plus (2016)
Joe Pernice (2020)

See also
List of Hot 100 number-one singles of 1975 (U.S.)
List of number-one adult contemporary singles of 1974 (U.S.)
List of number-one singles of 2003 (Ireland)
List of number-one singles from the 2000s (UK)

References

External links
Songfacts: Mandy by Barry Manilow
 

1971 songs
1971 singles
1974 singles
2003 singles
Barry Manilow songs
Bunny Walters songs
Westlife songs
Song recordings produced by Steve Mac
Songs written by Richard Kerr (songwriter)
Songs written by Scott English
Billboard Hot 100 number-one singles
Cashbox number-one singles
RPM Top Singles number-one singles
Number-one singles in Scotland
UK Singles Chart number-one singles
Irish Singles Chart number-one singles
Pop ballads
Fontana Records singles
Bell Records singles
Bertelsmann Music Group singles
1970s ballads
Sony Music singles
RCA Records singles